Aziz Sejawal (also spelt Sajawal or Sajaawal) is an Indian film director of Bollywood films. He has worked with major Bollywood actors such as Dharmendra, Mithun Chakraborty, Madhuri Dixit, Amrish Puri, Om Puri, Aditya Pancholi, Jackie Shroff, Juhi Chawla, Sanjay Dutt, Govinda and Rani Mukerji. Most of his films have comedic elements, though they often address themes of injustice and corruption.

Filmography
Ilaaka (1989)
Baap Numbri Beta Dus Numbri (1990)
Adharm (1992)
Shatranj (1993)
Andolan (1995)
Mafia (1996)
Sanam (1997)
Hero Hindustani (1998)
Chhupa Rustam: A Musical Thriller (2001)
Chalo Ishq Ladaaye (2002)

References

External links 
 

Hindi-language film directors
Living people
20th-century Indian film directors
21st-century Indian film directors
Year of birth missing (living people)